Isopachys borealis, also known as Lang's isopachys, is a species of skink. It is found in Thailand and Myanmar. Isopachys borealis is limbless and fossorial, occurring in the moist topsoil of tuber and fruit plantations; its natural habitat preferences are poorly known.

References

Isopachys
Reptiles of Myanmar
Reptiles of Thailand
Reptiles described in 1990
Taxa named by Mathias Lang
Taxa named by Wolfgang Böhme (herpetologist)